This is a list of Iranian (Persian) musicians and musical groups.

Classical

Persian classical/traditional

Moein
 Homayoun Shajarian
 Mohammad-Reza Shajarian
 Hossein Khajeh Amiri (Iraj)
 Shahram Nazeri
 Iraj Bastami
 Anoushiravan Rohani
 Reza Rohani
 Fariborz Lachini
 Gholam-Hossein Banan
 Delkash
 Alireza Eftekhari
 Bardia Sadrenoori
 Mohammad Reza Lotfi
 Hossein Alizadeh
 Marzieh
 Mirza Abdollah
 Maryam Akhondy
 Nematollah Aghasi
 Azam Ali
 Aref Ensemble
 Davood Azad
 Pejman Azarmina
 Mohammad Mehdi Goorangi
 Mohammad Motamedi
 Hossein Behroozinia
 Sima Bina
 Chemirani Ensemble
 Mehdi Bozorgmehr
 Darya Dadvar
 Nur Ali Elahi
 Reza Ghassemi
 Shusha Guppy
 Hamavayan Ensemble
 Parvaz Homay
 Sa'id Hormozi
 Mirza Hossein-Qoli
 Kayhan Kalhor
 The Kamkars
 Darvish Khan
 Ruhollah Khaleghi
 Lian Ensemble
 Javad Maroofi
 Mastan Ensemble
 Rokneddin Mokhtari
 Hamid Motebassem
 Hamid Reza Noorbakhsh
 Hossein Omoumi
 Parisa
 Faramarz Payvar
 Iraj Rahmanpour
 Afsaneh Rasaei
 Abolhasan Saba
 Dariush Safvat
 Abdolvahab Shahidi
 Jalil Shahnaz
 Ali-Akbar Shahnazi
 Shams Ensemble
 Farhang Sharif
 Haj Ghorban Soleimani
 Ali Tajvidi
 Dariush Talai
 Mehdi Rajabian
 Hossein Tehrani
 Alinaghi Vaziri
 Qamar ol-Molouk Vaziri
 Mortezâ Varzi
 Amir Abbas Zare
 Hasan Zirak
 Jalal Zolfonun
 Mahmoud Zolfonun
 Zyriab
 Parviz Yahaghi
 Salar Aghili
 Ali Zand Vakili

Modern/traditional

 Axiom of Choice
 Zohreh Jooya
 Mohammad Nouri
 Niyaz
 Ramin Rahimi
 Hangi Tavakoli
 Roseland
 Shanbehzadeh Ensemble
 Vas
 Chaartaar

Western classical / Persian symphonic

 Ahmad Pejman
 Ali Rahbari
 Alireza Mashayekhi
 Alireza Motevaseli
 Aminollah Hossein
 Anoushiravan Rohani
 Arshia Samsaminia
 Behzad Ranjbaran
 Bijan Mortazavi
 Cyrus Forough
 Darya Dadvar
 Daryush Shokof
 Farhad Fakhreddini
 Fouzieh Majd
 Hangi Tavakoli
 Heshmat Sandjari
 Hooman Khalatbari
 Houshang Ostovar
 Hossein Dehlavi
 Hormoz Farhat
 Idin Samimi Mofakham
 Kayvan Mirhadi
 Loris Tjeknavorian
 Lotfi Mansouri
 Morteza Hannaneh
 Mehdi Hosseini
 Mehdi Rajabian
 Nader Mashayekhi
 Nima A Rowshan
 Parviz Mahmoud
 Ramin Karimloo
 Reza Najfar
 Reza Vali
 Saman Samadi
 Samin Baghtcheban
 Soheil Nasseri
 Sadegh Nojouki
 Shahrdad Rohani

Pop

Singers

 Afshin
 Afshin Moghaddam
 Ali Abdolmaleki
 Ali Lohrasbi
 Ali Pahlavan
 Alireza Assar
 Alireza Talischi
 Andy
 Arash
 Aref
 Babak Jahanbakhsh
 Baran
 Benyamin Bahadori
 Bijan Mortazavi
 Dariush
 Ebi (Ebrahim Hamedi)
 Ehsan Khajeh Amiri
 Elaheh
 Faramarz Asef
 Faramarz Aslani
 Farhad
 Farman Fathalian
 Farzad Farzin
 Farzane Zamen
 Fereydoon Forooghi
 Fereydoun Farrokhzad
 Googoosh (Faegheh Atashin)
 Habib
 Hassan Shamaizadeh
 Hayedeh
 Homeyra
 Hooshmand Aghili
 Javad Yasari
 Kouros Shahmiri
 Laleh
 Leila Forouhar
 Mahasti
 Mahvash
 Majid Akhshabi
 Mansour
 Marjan
 Martik
 Maziar
 Mehdi Yarrahi
 Mehrnoosh
 Moein
 Mohammad Esfahani
 Mohsen Chavoshi
 Mohsen Ebrahimzadeh
 Mohsen Yeganeh
 Morteza
 Morteza Pashaei
 Nematollah Aghasi
 Omid Hajili
 Pooran
 Pouya Kolahi
 Pouya Pourjalil
 Pyruz
 Roozbeh Azar
 Rana Mansour
 Reza Sadeghi
 Roya Arab
 Sahar
 Sami Beigi
 Sami Yusuf
 Sasy
 Sattar
 Sepideh
 Shadmehr Aghili
 Shahkar Bineshpajooh
 Shahram Shabpareh
 Shahram BozorgMehr
 Shahrum Kashani
 Shakila
 Shohreh Solati
 Siavash Ghomayshi
 Siavash Shams
 Sirvan Khosravi
 Susan
 Susan Roshan
 Viguen
 Xaniar Khosravi

Bands

 25band
 Arian
 Barobax
 Kako Band

Songwriters

 Ilya
 Hangi Tavakoli
 Roya Arab
 Mina Assadi
 Laleh

Lyricists 

 Amir Tataloo
 Molana
 Shahyar Ghanbari
 Maryam Heydarzadeh
 Leila Kasra
 Hangi Tavakoli
 Sahar Ajdamsani
 Rahim Moeini Kermanshahi

Rock/Metal

Singers

 Afshin Moghadam
 Ali Azimi
 Kamil Yaghmaei
 Kavus Torabi
 Kourosh Yaghmaei
 Kaveh Afagh
 Habib
 Martik Kanian
 Maryama
 Mohsen Chavoshi
 Morteza Pashaei
 Pouya Kolahi
 Reza Yazdani
 Salim Ghazi Saeedi
 Shahin Najafi
 Mohsen Namjoo

Bands

 127
 Angband
 Antikarisma
 Arashk
 Arsames
 Barad
 Hypernova
 Kiosk
 Take It Easy Hospital
 The Yellow Dogs Band

Electronic

 Ashkan Kooshanejad
 Middle Eastern Soda (Ardavan Aryan)
 Leila Arab
 Deep Dish
 DJ Aligator
 Masoud
 Steve Naghavi
 Nami
 Ali "Dubfire" Shirazinia
 Sharam Tayebi
 Patrick Alavi

Rap/Hip Hop 

 Zedbazi
 Hichkas
 Erfan
 Alireza JJ
 Bahram
 Shahin Najafi
 Amir Tataloo
 Yas

Jazz 

 Ardeshir Farah
 Rana Farhan
 Cymin Samawatie
 Shahin and Sepehr
 Ziba Shirazi

Blues 

 Kourosh Yaghmaei
 Martik Qarah Khanian

Film composers

 Saeed Shahram
 Fariborz Lachini

See also 
 Music of Iran
 Shiraz Arts Festival
 Iranian Rock Music
 Persian pop music
 Iranian Rap

References

 
Musicians
Iranians